Sulphur Creek is a stream in the U.S. state of South Dakota.

The creek is a sulphur spring, hence the name.

See also
List of rivers of South Dakota

References 

Rivers of Butte County, South Dakota
Rivers of Meade County, South Dakota
Rivers of South Dakota